Arhopala major is a species of butterfly belonging to the lycaenid family described by Otto Staudinger in 1889. It is found in  Southeast Asia (Sumatra, Peninsular Malaya, Borneo, Nias, Tioman).

Subspecies
Arhopala major major (Sumatra, Peninsular Malaya, Borneo, Nias)
Arhopala major parvimaculata Okubo, 1983 (Tioman)

References

External links
"Arhopala Boisduval, 1832" at Markku Savela's Lepidoptera and Some Other Life Forms

Arhopala
Butterflies described in 1889
Taxa named by Otto Staudinger
Butterflies of Asia